The Codex Gissensis (Universitätsbibliothek Giessen, Handschrift 651/20) was a fragmentary parchment manuscript, a Gothic–Latin diglot containing texts of the Bible in Gothic on the left and Latin on the right.

The manuscript was made in the 6th century AD. Only a double-folio single leaf was known. It was discovered in Antinoë in Egypt and in 1907 brought to the German town Giessen, from which it gets is common name. During World War II, the manuscript was placed in the vault of the Dresdner Bank branch in Giessen to protect it from air raids. In 1945, the river Lahn flooded the vault and the manuscript was destroyed. The manuscript can be studied today only from photographs taken in 1910.

The Gothic column contain the text from Luke 23:11–14 and 24:13–17, while the Latin contains some from Luke 23:3–6, 24:5–9. The Gothic Bible is the 4th-century translation of Ulfilas, while the Latin is the Vetus Latina with some readings from the Vulgate.

References

Further reading
Snædal, Magnús. "The Gothic Text of Codex Gissensis." In Christian T. Petersen (ed.), Gotica Minora II: Scripta nova et vetera. Frankfurt, 2003): 1-20.

6th-century biblical manuscripts
Gissensis
Gothic Bible
Lost biblical manuscripts
1945 disestablishments in Germany